The Vidarbha Cricket Association Ground is a cricket ground located in the city of Nagpur.

The ground is known as the VCA Ground and belongs to the Central Zone. The first match was played here in October 1969. As of 19 August 2017, it has hosted nine Tests and 14 ODIs.

It has been replaced by a new stadium called Vidarbha Cricket Association Stadium as an international cricket stadium. It continues to be used by the Vidarbha and Uttar Pradesh cricket teams.

Sunil Gavaskar scored his only one day century here against New Zealand in the 1987 Reliance World Cup.

In 1995, during the 5th ODI between India and New Zealand, a wall in the East Stand collapsed, killing 9 people and injuring 70 others.

History

The tenth Test venue in the country, the Vidarbha Cricket Association-managed ground, probably the only international venue where you can walk straight into the ground from the road, has always made headlines for various reasons.

Chetan Sharma takes the first Cricket World Cup hat-trick in history, with the wickets of Ken Rutherford, Ian Smith and Ewen Chatfield in Nagpur.  All three were bowled.

Sunil Gavaskar got his only one-day, and World Cup, century here when India won by a huge margin against New Zealand in their final league encounter of the 1987 Reliance World Cup. This is the second best ground for Sachin Tendulkar when it comes to centuries. 
Sachin Tendulkar has three here after four in Chepauk.

As for the pitch, previously, it was just like any other docile pitch, till the BCCI-appointed pitch committee recommended the re-laying of the wicket in 1999. It took a while for the wicket to assume the true shape that it was designed to.

Also the unique thing about this wicket is the 30-inch deep double-brick layer normally there is a 15-inch brick layer – that facilitates in the extra pace and bounce. Surely, that was the a case when Australia conquered the 'final frontier' as they beat India handsomely in the third Test to win the Border-Gavaskar Trophy.

The local critics were up-in-arms at how the curator ignored the home team's cause and prepared a fast wicket that helped the opposition fast bowlers. But the curator insisted that he had simply followed the instructions of the pitch panel. Today Nagpur is one of the only grounds to assist genuine fast bowlers in pace and movement and several first-class games in the 2004/05 season ended within three days as the medium-pacers reaped rich rewards.

Records

Test

Batting 
 Highest team total: 609/6 dec, by India against Zimbabwe in 2000/01, then 570/7 and 546/9, all by India.
 Lowest team total: 109, by India against New Zealand in 1969/70.
 Highest individual score: 232*, by Andy Flower against India in 2000/01.
 Most runs scored by Sachin Tendulkar (659 runs), Rahul Dravid (423 runs) and Andy Flower (298 runs).

Bowling 
 Best bowling in an innings: 7/51, by Maninder Singh against Sri Lanka in 1986/87.
 Leading wicket takers Anil Kumble (20 wickets), Zaheer Khan (12 wickets) and Maninder Singh (10 wickets).

One Day International

Batting 
 Highest team total: 350, by India against Sri Lanka in 2005/06, New Zealand 348/3 and India 338/3.
 Lowest team total: 154, by Zimbabwe against Australia in 1995/96.
 Highest individual score: 149, by Shivnarine Chanderpaul against India in 2006/07.
 Most runs scored by Sourav Ganguly (398 runs), Rahul Dravid (392 runs) and Sachin Tendulkar (390 runs).

Bowling 
 Best bowling in an innings: 6/29, by Patrick Patterson against India in 1987/88.
 Leading wicket takers were Ravi Shastri (8 wickets), Patrick Patterson (6 wickets) and Abdul Qadir (6 wickets).

List of Centuries

Key
 * denotes that the batsman was not out.
 Inns. denotes the number of the innings in the match.
 Balls denotes the number of balls faced in an innings.
 NR denotes that the number of balls was not recorded.
 Parentheses next to the player's score denotes his century number at Edgbaston.
 The column title Date refers to the date the match started.
 The column title Result refers to the player's team result

Test Centuries

One Day Internationals

List of Five Wicket Hauls

Key

Tests

One Day Internationals

See also
 Vidarbha Cricket Association Stadium
List of Test cricket grounds

References

External links

VCA ground 
Vidarbha Cricket Association Stadium Seating Layout 
Statistical Overview 

Cricket grounds in Maharashtra
Sport in Nagpur
Vidarbha
Sports venues in Nagpur
Sports venues in Maharashtra
Test cricket grounds in India
Cricket in Vidarbha
Sports venues completed in 1929
1929 establishments in India
1987 Cricket World Cup stadiums
1996 Cricket World Cup stadiums
20th-century architecture in India